Pets de sœur, literally Nun farts, is a Quebecois dessert that is made from pie dough; often from left over Tourtière dough, that is layered with butter, brown sugar, then rolled, sliced, placed in a pan, covered with additional brown sugar, and finally baked. It is called Pets de Soeur as it was served by Nuns at boarding schools in some parts of the province of Quebec.

In Quebec, they are often served during the Christmas holidays and may be served as part of Réveillons; which is a family gathering that occurs on Christmas Eve for Quebecers. Variations may replace the brown sugar with molasses, caramel sauce or maple syrup; however, this is not common nor traditional.

See also
Cuisine of Quebec
Canadian cuisine
Acadian cuisine

References

Cuisine of Quebec
Pastries
Canadian desserts